Gayleatha Beatrice Brown (June 20, 1947 – April 19, 2013) was a United States foreign service officer and ambassador. She served in several diplomatic posts during her career with the U.S. Department of State including U.S. ambassador to Benin.

Education
Brown was educated at the Red Jacket Elementary School, Matewan Elementary and High Schools in Mingo County, West Virginia. She was senior class president and graduated from Edison High School in Edison, New Jersey. She has BA and MA honor degrees from Howard University. She conducted post-graduate work in international relations at the School of Advanced International Studies (SAIS) at Johns Hopkins University.

Career
Before joining the Department of State, Ambassador Brown was a Special Assistant to the Agency for International Development (USAID) Assistant Administrator for Africa and a legislative assistant in the House of Representatives of the U.S. Congress.

Brown's postings with the Department of State included:
Ambassador to Benin
Counselor for Political Affairs at the U.S. Embassy in Pretoria, South Africa
U.S. Consul General at the American Consulate General and concurrently as the U.S. Deputy Permanent Observer to the Council of Europe in Strasbourg, France
Chief of the Economic and Commercial Sections at the U.S. Embassies in Harare, Zimbabwe; and Dar es Salaam, Tanzania
Desk Officer for Canada, Senegal, Guinea, and Mauritania at the State Department in Washington
Economic Officer/Regional United States Agency for International Development (USAID) Representative and Finance and Development Officer at the U.S. Embassies in Paris and Abidjan
Representative of the State Department Organization for Economic Cooperation and Development (OECD) Export Credit Arrangement negotiations

President Obama nominated Brown for the ambassadorial post to Burkina Faso on July 2, 2009, and she was confirmed by the Senate on August 4. However, she never officially assumed this post.

Honors
Lady of the Golden Horseshoe (West Virginia state academic honor)
Among the first women Rotarians in Tanzania
Charter member of the New Jersey Edison Township High School Alumni Hall of Fame
Two Department of State Superior Honor Awards
State Department Meritorious Honor Award
Honorary member of the Alpha Kappa Alpha (AKA) Sorority and Sandown Rotary Club in Johannesburg, South Africa

Ambassador Brown spoke English, French and Swahili. She wrote poetry, enjoyed reading (particularly mystery novels), and loved dancing, tennis, t'ai chi, and music (especially gospel, soul, jazz, classical). She was a member of the Shiloh Baptist Church (Pilgrim Circle) in Washington, D.C. and was associated with the Community Church of Iselin, New Jersey.

References

Sources
 
United States Department of State: Biography of Gayleatha Brown
White House press release

1947 births
2013 deaths
African-American diplomats
Ambassadors of the United States to Benin
Ambassadors of the United States to Burkina Faso
American women ambassadors
Howard University alumni
Paul H. Nitze School of Advanced International Studies alumni
People from Matewan, West Virginia
People from Edison, New Jersey
United States Foreign Service personnel
Edison High School (New Jersey) alumni
20th-century African-American people
21st-century African-American people
20th-century African-American women
21st-century African-American women